The Río Espíritu Santo is a river of Río Grande, Puerto Rico. Espíritu Santo River begins at the highest elevation of the El Yunque National Forest.

Description
Río Espíritu Santo is located in the Río Espíritu Santo Natural Reserve. It is operated by the Puerto Rico Department of Natural and Environmental Resources.

The river is scenic with pools, waterfalls, and rapids within extensive tropical forest.

The Río Espíritu Santo Observation Point is located on PR-186 km 18.9.

Gallery

See also
 List of rivers in Puerto Rico

References

External links
 USGS Hydrologic Unit Map – Caribbean Region (1974)
 Ground-Water Resources of Alluvial Valleys in Northeastern Puerto  Rico - Rio Espfritu Santo to Rio Demajagua Area
 Rio Espfritu Santo Plate 1 USGS

Rivers of Puerto Rico